Taurus is the second astrological sign in the modern zodiac. It spans from 30° to 60° of the zodiac. This sign belongs to the Earth element or triplicity, and has a feminine or negative polarity, as well as a fixed modality, quality, or quadruplicity. It is a Venus-ruled sign along with Libra. The Moon is in its exaltation here at exactly 3°. The Sun transits this sign from approximately April 20 until May 20 in western astrology.

History
The sign of Taurus is associated with several myths and bull worship from several ancient cultures. It was the first sign of the zodiac established among the Mesopotamians, who called it "The Great Bull of Heaven," as it was the constellation through which the Sun rose on the vernal equinox at that time, that is the Early Bronze Age, from about 4000 BC to 1700 BC.

Astrological associations
Taurus is the fixed modality of the three earth signs, the others being Virgo and Capricorn.

See also

Astronomical symbols
Chinese zodiac
Circle of stars
Cusp (astrology)
Elements of the zodiac

Notes

Works cited
 Longitude of Sun, apparent geocentric ecliptic of date, interpolated to find the time of crossing 0°, 30°...

External links
 Warburg Institute Iconographic Database (over 300 medieval and early modern images of Taurus) 

Western astrological signs
Mythological bovines
Taurus in astrology